Niedersteinbach is a commune in the Bas-Rhin département in Grand Est in north-eastern France.

Sites and monuments
 Château du Wasigenstein - 13th-century castle

See also
 Communes of the Bas-Rhin department

References

Communes of Bas-Rhin